Plotnikova is a rural locality (a village) in Stepanovskoye Rural Settlement, Kudymkarsky District, Perm Krai, Russia. The population was 140 as of 2010. There are 10 streets.

Geography 
Plotnikova is located 5 km east of Kudymkar (the district's administrative centre) by road. Malaya Serva is the nearest rural locality.

References 

Rural localities in Kudymkarsky District